Michael Alexander (born 28 March 1993) is a 60 kg boxer from Port of Spain, Trinidad. He won a bronze medal at the Pan American Championships in 2013, bronze at the 2014 Commonwealth Games in Glasgow, Scotland, and a third bronze at the 2014 Central American and Caribbean Games in Veracruz, Mexico.

Alexander won a silver medal at the 2018 Central American and Caribbean Games in Barranquilla, Colombia.
Michael Alexander is the father of Aiden Henrry Ishmael Alexander who was born on the 12th of October 2012 to Michael's first wife Sonia Reid when they were only 18 years old; Subsequently the two divorced and both went their separate ways.
In 2019 he Won Bronze at the Pan American Games in Lima Peru.

References

1993 births
Living people
Sportspeople from Port of Spain
Trinidad and Tobago male boxers
Commonwealth Games medallists in boxing
Commonwealth Games bronze medallists for Trinidad and Tobago
Boxers at the 2014 Commonwealth Games
Boxers at the 2018 Commonwealth Games
Central American and Caribbean Games silver medalists for Trinidad and Tobago
Central American and Caribbean Games bronze medalists for Trinidad and Tobago
Competitors at the 2014 Central American and Caribbean Games
Competitors at the 2018 Central American and Caribbean Games
Boxers at the 2019 Pan American Games
Pan American Games bronze medalists for Trinidad and Tobago
Pan American Games medalists in boxing
Lightweight boxers
Central American and Caribbean Games medalists in boxing
Medalists at the 2019 Pan American Games
Medallists at the 2014 Commonwealth Games